The Merbok River is a river in Kedah, Malaysia. Its sources are at Mount Jerai and Sungkap Forest. After the confluence of Bongkok and Lalang River it carry its name. Other tributaries are the Petani and Bujang River. The river mouth is around 2.5 km wide.

It is best known as the historical river of Lembah Bujang.

See also
 List of rivers of Malaysia

References

Rivers of Kedah
Rivers of Malaysia